The Portugal women's national field hockey team represents Portugal in women's international field hockey and is controlled by the Portuguese Hockey Federation, the governing body for field hockey in Portugal.

Portugal made their international women's debut at the 2021 Women's EuroHockey Championship III, they won their first-ever match 6–1 against Slovakia.

Tournament record

EuroHockey Championship III
2021 – 5th place

See also
Portugal men's national field hockey team

References

European women's national field hockey teams
National team
Field hockey